Timothy Robert Wilson (born 12 March 1980) is a former Australian politician and a member of the Liberal Party of Australia who served as the Federal Member for Goldstein in the Australian House of Representatives from 2016 to 2022. Wilson served as the Chair of the Standing Committee on Economics from 2018 to 2021 and as the Assistant Minister to the Minister for Industry, Energy and Emissions Reduction from 2021 to 2022. In the 2022 Australian federal election, Wilson lost his seat to independent candidate Zoe Daniel.

Before entering politics, Wilson was a policy director at the Institute of Public Affairs (IPA) from 2007 to 2013 and Australia's Human Rights Commissioner from 2014 to 2016.

Early life 
Wilson was born on 12 March 1980 in Prahran, Victoria. He is the second of three children. His maternal grandfather immigrated to Australia from Armenia and was a survivor of the Armenian genocide. Wilson has been described by the Armenian National Committee of Australia as a "vocal and prominent supporter of Armenian-Australian issues, fiercely advocating for his government's recognition of the Armenian genocide and solidarity with the indigenous Armenian self-determined Republic of Artsakh".

In his early years, Wilson's parents ran pubs in Richmond and on Little Collins Street. Following their divorce he moved to Mount Martha and attended Mount Martha Primary School and The Peninsula School, Mount Eliza. At Monash University, Wilson studied fine arts before transferring and completing a Bachelor of Arts (Policy Studies) and a Masters of Diplomacy and Trade (International Trade). He was elected President of the Monash University Student Union Caulfield in 2002 and again in 2003.

Early career

Institute of Public Affairs (IPA) 
Wilson was employed by the Institute of Public Affairs for seven years, serving as Director of Climate Change Policy and of Intellectual Property and Free Trade. Wilson studied environmental issues in a variety of postgraduate studies.

Human Rights Commissioner (HRC) 

During his time at the IPA, Wilson was a vocal critic of the Human Rights Commission and called for the abolition of the Commission.

He was appointed as Australia's Human Rights Commissioner between February 2014 and February 2016. On appointment to the Human Rights Commission, Wilson resigned his membership of the Liberal Party.

It was reported that in the first year following his appointment, Wilson claimed $77,000 in expenses including almost $15,000 in taxi fares, computer equipment including $1,400 on a desk and $37,000 on airfares. Wilson's response to these charges was "You'd rather I sit in my office all day?". The Australian Human Rights Commission stated that "The travel expenses of commissioners are proportionate to the work required to fulfil their statutory obligations" and that Wilson "completed two major national consultations which required travel to remote, rural and regional Australia as well as capital cities".

In July 2020, it was revealed that, while a commissioner, he had used his Commission email account to introduce a prominent international speaker to the Institute of Public Affairs for an event, as well as arrange his attendance at the free market think-tank's functions, and to obtain from someone an endorsement in support of his campaign to gain Liberal preselection for Parliament. Wilson acknowledged that he had opposed release of the emails, which had been sought through a freedom of information application, but considered them "utterly irrelevant" and a "non-story”, saying his support of the IPA was publicly disclosed and well known throughout his term. Furthermore Wilson stated he originally halted the release of the emails to toy with the freedom of information applicant to "make sure the applicant thought there was something salacious in these emails only to be disappointed that they were utterly irrelevant and they'd wasted their time, and sadly that of the hard-working people at the Australian Human Rights Commission, who had to compile and redact these documents".

Politics

Early campaign 
In 2008, Wilson, then a Liberal Party member, ran for the position of deputy mayor of the City of Melbourne in a joint ticket with Peter McMullin, a former Labor mayor of Geelong. Wilson and McMullin lost.

Federal parliament

First and second terms 
On 19 March 2016, Wilson was preselected as the Liberal candidate for the seat of Goldstein. He defeated Denis Dragovic by two votes. Fellow IPA member, Georgina Downer was also a preselection candidate, but lost in the first round of voting. As recently as 2014, Wilson did not live in the electorate, but moved into the electoral boundaries in anticipation for the election.

Wilson was subsequently elected to the Australian House of Representatives at the 2016 election. He is a member of the Moderate/Modern Liberal faction of the Liberal Party.

In his first term he served on the Standing Committee on Health, Aged Care and Sport, the Standing Committee on Industry, Innovation, Science and Resources and the Standing Committee on Social Policy and Legal Affairs.

When Prime Minister Malcolm Turnbull called a spill of leadership positions in 2018, Wilson supported Turnbull against Peter Dutton. Following the vote to remove Turnbull, Wilson moved his support behind the eventual winner, Scott Morrison as the new Liberal leader and Prime Minister.

In 2018, Wilson was appointed by Scott Morrison as the chair of the House of Representatives Standing Committee on Economics.

Wilson won a second term at the 2019 election.

Wilson was promoted to be an assistant minister in September 2021. He was named as the assistant to Angus Taylor responsible for the areas of industry, energy and emissions reduction.

2022 election campaign 
Prior to the 2022 federal election, community group Voices of Goldstein announced that they were endorsing former ABC journalist, Zoe Daniel as an independent candidate for the election. Prior to the election being called, Wilson wrote to people in his constituency claiming it was "unlawful to erect signs until after the election has been called." Wilson called on people to pass on the personal details of any signs.

The council confirmed that they had no intention of fining residents and that the signs were erected legally as it was within three months of 21 May, the last date for a joint House and Senate election, but Wilson claimed that the council had "flipped" as their initial advice to him was different. The council later removed the advice from their website on appeal from Wilson, since technically a House election can happen separately from the Senate and be held as late as 3 September.

Daniel's campaign director challenged the decision in the Supreme Court who ruled that the signs were legal. The Age called the ruling a 'humiliating result' for Bayside Council.

Wilson's Election Sign campaign is cited as an example of the Streisand Effect when an attempt to hide, remove, or censor information has the unintended consequence of increasing awareness of that information.

At the 2022 Australian federal election Wilson lost his seat to Daniel and suffered a 13% swing against him.

Political positions

Climate and Environment 
Whilst Director of Climate Change Policy at the Institute of Public Affairs (IPA), Wilson argued against Australia being a party to the Kyoto Protocol and was against any government prices on carbon. Following the 2019 election win, Wilson endorsed the cuts under the Kyoto and Paris Agreement and claimed that the Liberal party would meet their targets, a reverse of their position prior to the election.

During Wilson's tenure as a policy director at the IPA, the group called for the closing of the Climate Change Authority, the ending of the Renewable Energy Target and defunding of the Australian Renewable Energy Agency and the Clean Energy Finance Corporation.

Despite personally not expressing climate change denial, Wilson has endorsed people's right to express such views, and was opposed to universities preventing such views from being taught in their institutions. Wilson himself has explained that he has an "open mind" regarding the science behind climate change.

LGBT issues 
Wilson defended the rights of religious groups to discriminate against LGBTI people. He was praised by the Australian Christian Lobby for this stance. In 2022 he defended the free speech rights of Margaret Court who was accused of homophobic beliefs, and rejected the public calls to remove her name from Margaret Court Arena.

Same-sex marriage 

Wilson had been a public advocate for same-sex marriage for more than a decade prior to its becoming legal in Australia.

The Abbott Government in 2015 promised a public vote on same-sex marriage, which was remained the coalition policy for the Turnbull Government. Following the 2016 federal election, Wilson supported the legislation for a public plebiscite on the basis that it was the fastest route to reform, although other advocates for the amendments to the law suggested the quickest and cheapest way was through a conscience vote on the floor of parliament.

Wilson opposed efforts to block the Australian Marriage Law Postal Survey in the High Court and continued as a prominent Liberal campaigner for the 'YES' vote during the plebiscite process.

Freedom of speech and human rights 
Wilson has been a strong advocate for freedom of speech from his time in the IPA. He is an advocate of almost all speech to be able to be expressed in public.

He also argued against plain package cigarettes as an attack on the property rights of the cigarette companies, and was against the anti-bikie laws in Queensland, that aimed to hamper the criminal activities of several motorcycle gangs.

In November 2021, Wilson made amendments to a bill that was outside his ministerial purview to grant legal immunity to aged care providers if they restrain a resident against their will. The government claimed that this was an outcome that was called for from the Royal Commission into Aged Care Quality and Safety.

18C of the Racial Discrimination Act 
During his time in the IPA, he pushed to repeal Section 18C of the Racial Discrimination Act which outlaws offensive behavior because of "race, colour or national or ethnic origin". When testifying before the senate committee he was unsure if freedom from discrimination should exist, and that he was defending the human rights of minorities to express their opinions. Wilson called the laws "democratically dangerous".

During the term of his appointment he supported the Abbott Government's attempted changes to Section 18C of the 1975 Racial Discrimination Act. Wilson argued that 18C was ineffective in preventing racial discrimination and instead asserted civil codes of conducts imposed by employers, industry and community groups would bring cultural change. President of the Australian Human Rights Commission, Gillian Triggs, stated that Wilson was "on board" with the rest of the Commission regarding the removal of 18C. In one instance, when questioned if he accepted that any person had the right to use racial slurs including the word "nigger" he replied "I won't say it, but that's right", while adding that "even petty and casual racism is unacceptable".

Wilson argued that under the existing laws it would create severe limits on what could be said in the public sphere, for example, he claimed that a magazine such as Charlie Hebdo would not be able to be published in Australia without censorship. However the Executive Council of Australian Jewry called Wilson's arguments "wrong" and "hysterical nonsense".

Franking credits 
When Scott Morrison ascended to the prime ministership he appointed Wilson as Chair of the House of Representatives Standing Committee on Economics. Under Wilson's tenure, the Committee launched an inquiry into Labor's election promise, the proposed changes to refundable franking credits, holding a series of public hearings around the country. Wilson argued that Labor's policy constituted a 'retiree tax' that would damage the savings and superannuation balances of up to one million retirees. Opponents of the hearings saw the process as a series of sham hearings aimed at advancing the Coalition's agenda.

It was later revealed that the inquiry had a number of legal and procedural issues that were directly linked back to Wilson.

 On 31 October Wilson anonymously registered the domain stoptheretirementtax.com to allow people to register to speak before the inquiry. The site had a commonwealth coat of arms and also solicited submissions.
 Wilson sent a letter out urging people "to campaign against Labor's retirement tax". The letter had both the Commonwealth logo and Liberal party branding, a clear breach of commonwealth guidelines.
 Wilson arranged for meetings to coincide with an activist group opposing Labor's policy and contained the "possible intention to engage in protest activity at the hearing". As the chair he also tolerated the handing out political party material at the hearings. This was one of the actions he would later be rebuked for by the speaker.
 Wilson brought in a cousin, Geoff Wilson, to assist in the inquiry. Geoff Wilson managed an investment fund that he founded. The fund was revealed to have the value of $3 billion, and Tim Wilson had funds under management. Geoff Wilson was recorded talking about how he was using a taxpayer funded inquiry to defeat a policy that he was opposed to.

In February 2019, Labor accused Wilson of improperly interfering with the committee's inquiry into dividend imputations and had committed a contempt of parliament. The Speaker found that while no contempt had been committed, Wilson had not honoured committee conventions and rebuked Wilson for the manner in which the inquiry took place.

Superannuation and housing 
Wilson has been a long time critic of the superannuation industry, something Wilson himself denies, and an advocate for using super contributions to fund a deposit on housing.

In September 2020, Wilson was criticised in responding to concerns regarding the level of the superannuation guarantee rate for women on Twitter with "[I'd prefer that] they can buy their own home so they're not homeless".

He then began a push for people to be able to use their superannuation to pay for a deposit on a house. Wilson began using the hashtag on Twitter of #homefirstsupersecond to support his campaign.

There were a number of negative reactions to Wilson's policy including former prime minister Malcolm Turnbull calling it "the craziest idea I've heard" and said that the policy had "some really poor arguments". According to a study by The McKell Institute Wilson's idea would send house prices soaring and would leave most investors worse off in the long term.

Others focused on several tweets by Wilson's that appeared to be giving unlicensed financial advice.

The chief executive of Industry Super Australia said that Wilson had "a clear conflict of interest", Wilson responded by saying the group was "bullying" the government.

COVID-19 
Amid the 2020 COVID-19 pandemic, Wilson wrote to the Australian Human Rights Commission (as a previous head) and the Victorian Equal Opportunity & Human Rights Commission asking whether the Andrews Government's COVID-19 curfew could be justified on human rights grounds and whether there were ground for the commissions to take action to protect rights and freedoms. Wilson stated that he believed the curfew was "unjustified and does not meet the justification for a limitation on Victorians' human rights" due to public statements by the Chief Health Officer and Victorian Police Commissioner.

During the pandemic, Wilson was also critical of the actions of commercial airlines in relation to excessive fees charged to stranded overseas Australians describing the process as "gouging". Wilson called on National Cabinet to increase the number of Australians able to return from overseas on a state-by-state basis.

MyHealth 
Following the announcement by the Turnbull government of a deadline for Australians to opt out of the MyHealthRecord scheme, Wilson publicly opted-out and called for the Government to make 'opt-in' the default position because of privacy concerns.

Australian relations with China 
When he was at the IPA, Wilson accepted an all expenses paid trip to China, paid for by Huawei.

After entering parliament, Wilson became a member of the "Wolverines", an informal parliamentary group that take a critical view of Chinese diplomatic policy. Alongside fellow Wolverine James Paterson, Wilson accused Chinese telecoms company Huawei of creating surveillance systems for the Chinese government and urged the United Kingdom to ban the company. He has said that Huawei is a “greater moral evil” than poker machines.

Wilson has supported anti-government protestors in Hong Kong.

Wilson has been criticised by Chinese dissident artist Badiucao for being “all talk, no action”.

Personal life
Wilson grew up in the Mornington Peninsula, with his mother, Linda. His stepfather is Victorian politician David Morris.

Wilson is gay. Wilson proposed to his partner, Ryan Bolger, on the floor of parliament while giving a speech on the amendments to the marriage act on 4 December 2017. Both the proposal and Bolger's affirmative answer were recorded in Hansard and went viral on the internet. They were married on 11 March 2018.

Wilson said about his religious beliefs "I'm more of an agnostic, but I prefer to say that I haven't found God but I'm on a journey and I may one day find God."

After losing his seat in the 2022 Australian federal election, it has been reported that Wilson is planning on utilising his experience as a junior minister for industry, energy and emissions reduction to set up his own climate and energy advisory business.

Publications

References

External links
 
 

1980 births
Living people
Australian agnostics
Gay politicians
Politicians from Melbourne
LGBT conservatism
LGBT legislators in Australia
Monash University alumni
Free speech activists
Australian LGBT rights activists
Members of the Australian House of Representatives
Members of the Australian House of Representatives for Goldstein
Liberal Party of Australia members of the Parliament of Australia
21st-century Australian politicians
Australian people of Armenian descent
Member of the Mont Pelerin Society
People from Mount Martha, Victoria